Doctor Ox is a collection of short stories by Jules Verne, first published in 1874 by Pierre-Jules Hetzel.

It consists of four varied works by Verne:

"Une fantaisie du Docteur Ox" ("Dr. Ox's Experiment," 1872), illustrated by Lorenz Froelich
"Maître Zacharius" ("Master Zacharius," 1854), illustrated by Théophile Schuler
"Un drame dans les airs" ("A Drama in the Air," 1851), illustrated by Émile-Antoine Bayard
"Un hivernage dans les glaces" ("A Winter Amid the Ice," 1855), illustrated by Adrien Marie and Barbant

The collection also includes a preface by Pierre-Jules Hetzel and a story, "Quarantième ascension au mont Blanc" ("Fortieth Ascent of Mont Blanc"), written by Verne's brother Paul and illustrated by Edmond Yon.

References

External links 
 
  (translation by George Makepeace Towle)

1874 books
Short stories by Jules Verne
Science fiction short story collections